The Scharnebeck twin ship lift is a  boat lift in Scharnebeck, northeast of Lüneburg, in the District of Lüneburg, Lower Saxony, Germany. It is on the Elbe Lateral Canal, which connects the Elbe (northern and lower endpoint, at Artlenburg) and the Mittellandkanal (southern and upper endpoint, near Wolfsburg), and is one of two constructions on the canal that overcomes the height difference between the canal endpoints, the other being a  lock further south at Uelzen.

The first ship passed through the lift on 5 December 1975. There is a museum at the site.

Technical data
Design: double counterweight lift
Construction cost: 152 million Deutsche Mark
Vertical lift: max.  (depending on the water level of the Elbe)
Trough size: usable length x usable width x water depth 
Total weight of the trough filled with water: 
Total moving weight of a trough, the water contained, and associated parts: approx. 
Weight of one counterweight of which there are 224 per trough: approx.
Dimensions of one counterweight: 
Thickness of the steel cables: 
Source of power: Per trough, 4 electric motors of  each, giving a total of 
Time taken to lift or lower a trough: 3 minutes
Time taken to pass through the lift: 15–20 minutes
Visitors per year: approx. 500,000

Further reading

External links 

Technical Data 
Description of the lift

See also
Schiffshebewerk Scharnebeck, article on the German-language WikiPedia from which this article had been translated
List of boat lifts
Strépy-Thieu boat lift, Le Rœulx, Belgium
Peterborough lift lock, Ontario, Canada
Falkirk Wheel, Scotland, United Kingdom
Anderton boat lift, Anderton, United Kingdom

Boat lifts
Transport in Lower Saxony
Buildings and structures in Lower Saxony
Transport infrastructure completed in 1975